Cars is a commune in the Gironde department in Nouvelle-Aquitaine in southwestern France.

Population

Geography
Cars is located in the Blaye arrondissement near the intersection of Routes D133 and D937, about 4 km east of Blaye on the Gironde River.

See also
Communes of the Gironde department

References

Communes of Gironde